Joe Coleman may refer to:

Bongo Joe Coleman (1923–1999), American musician
Joe Coleman (baseball, born 1922) (1922–1997), American Major League Baseball pitcher
Joe Coleman (baseball, born 1947) (born 1947), American Major League Baseball pitcher
Joe Coleman (basketball) (born 1993), American basketball player
Joe Coleman (game designer), American game designer, also known as Joseph K. Adams
Joe Coleman (painter) (born 1955), American painter and illustrator
Joseph E. Coleman (1922–2000), American politician